Alexander Johnstone (31 July 1961 – 7 December 2016) was a Scottish Conservative politician. He served as a Member of the Scottish Parliament (MSP) for North East Scotland from 1999 until his death in 2016.

Political career
Johnstone had been Member of the Scottish Parliament for the North East Scotland electoral region since 1999. He fought the West Aberdeenshire and Kincardine constituency in the 2005 general election, finishing second. He also finished second in Angus North and Mearns at the 2011 Scottish Parliament election, but was re-elected as an additional member on the party list. He was the longest serving Conservative MSP of the Scottish Parliament and the last remaining Conservative MSP to have served continuously since the 1999 election.  In Holyrood he had served as Chief Whip and rural affairs spokesman for the Scottish Conservative Party and Shadow Minister for Transport, Infrastructure and Climate Change. In 2016, Johnstone was the party's spokesman for Housing, Transport and Infrastructure. Johnstone was deputy convenor of the Finance Committee of the Scottish Parliament.

In 2014, Johnstone and his colleague Nanette Milne re-paid more than £12,000 to the Scottish Parliament after breaching office expenses rules.

Johnstone, a Church of Scotland elder, made public comments against a proposal to let individual congregations select gay clergy for their church. He told the Press and Journal newspaper that a move to allow gay clergy would "ultimately weaken" the church. Johnstone was one of 18 MSPs who voted against same-sex marriage when, in February 2014, the Scottish Parliament backed it.

Personal life
Johnstone was educated at Mackie Academy in Stonehaven before working as a dairy and arable farmer. He married Linda in 1981 and they had two children, Alexander Johnstone (born 1983) and Christine Watson (born 1987).

Johnstone died of cancer on 7 December 2016. Scottish Conservative leader Ruth Davidson called him "a big man with a big heart" who "embodied politics at its best".

References

External links
 Alex Johnstone MSP personal site profile
 
 Alex Johnstone MSP profile at the site of the Scottish Conservatives
 Alex Johnstone MSP profile at the site of the Conservative Party

1961 births
2016 deaths
Elders of the Church of Scotland
People from Stonehaven
People educated at Mackie Academy
Conservative MSPs
Members of the Scottish Parliament 1999–2003
Members of the Scottish Parliament 2003–2007
Members of the Scottish Parliament 2007–2011
Members of the Scottish Parliament 2011–2016
Members of the Scottish Parliament 2016–2021
Scottish Conservative Party parliamentary candidates
Scottish farmers